Marty Brown, better known by his stage name Qwazaar, is an American underground hip hop artist from Chicago, Illinois. Qwazaar is co-founder of the underground rap crew Typical Cats, with fellow MCs Denizen Kane and Qwel, and producers / DJs Kid Knish and DJ Natural. He is also a member of the group Outerlimitz, with rapper Hellsent and producer Silence. Qwazaar also collaborates with Silence under the name Dirty Digital, and has released several collaborative records with Florida-born, Berlin-based producer Batsauce.

Discography

Albums
Qwazaar
 Walk Thru Walls (2001)
 Bat Meets Blaine (2011) (with Batsauce)

Typical Cats (Qwazaar with Denizen Kane, Qwel, DJ Natural & Kid Knish)
 Typical Cats (2001)
 Civil Service (2004)
 3 (2012)

Outerlimitz (Qwazaar with Hellsent & Silence)
 Wrong Actions for Right Reasons (1998)
 Suicide Prevention (2005)

EPs, mixtapes, compilations, singles
EPs
 Walk Thru Walls (Revised Edition Tour EP) (2008)
 Shockah (2009) (with Silence, as Dirty Digital)
 Style Be the King (2011) (with Batsauce)
 Stress Chasers (2014) (with Batsauce)

Mixtapes
 Riverstyx Radio Vol. 1 (2009)
 Digitape Side A (2010) (with Silence, as Dirty Digital)
 Digitape Side B (2011) (with Silence, as Dirty Digital)

Remix albums
 Walk Thru Walls / Fame Revise (2010)
 Bat Meets Blaine: The Remixes (2012) (with Batsauce)

Compilations
 Typical Bootlegs Vol. 1 (2004) (with Typical Cats)
 Lost Prevention: Unreleased & B-Sides (2005) (with Outerlimitz)
 Fun Razors, Rarities & Hits (2011)

Singles
 "Desert Eagle / I Tried / T.T.G.P." (2001)
 "Easy Cause It Is" (2004) (with Typical Cats)
 "Packaged in Plastic / Hypnotic" (with Outerlimitz)
 "Sodapopinski" (2008) (with Dirty Digital)
 "I Know / Til It's Done" (2011) (with Batsauce)

References

External links
 Official Website
 Qwazaar at Galapagos4

African-American male rappers
Living people
Rappers from Chicago
Underground rappers
Year of birth missing (living people)
21st-century American rappers
21st-century American male musicians
21st-century African-American musicians